"The Doctor of Geneva" is a poem from Wallace Stevens's first book of poetry, Harmonium (1923). The poem was first published in 1921, so it is free of copyright.

Interpretation
The doctor of Geneva, perhaps a doctor like John Calvin used to exploring
the depths of religious doctrine, is shaken by his encounter with the
raw power of the Pacific Ocean. A native of Geneva used to its landlocked
lakes, he is also more familiar with Racine's tragedies or Bossuet's
rhetoric than the high-rolling waves that pound the shore where he
stands.  Though professing no awe, he finds that his old European mind suffers an
"unburgherly apocalypse" by his encounter with the art of the New
World. Stevens is self-consciously contributing experiments towards a burgeoning 
American art that may cause traditionalists to use their handkerchiefs and sigh. Vendler sees this as one of Stevens's major themes.

On this reading the poem bears special comparison to The Paltry Nude Starts on a Spring Voyage and Ploughing on Sunday.

A letter from Stevens to an Austrian visitor to America returning to his home in Vienna, may be compared to the poem. 
I was tempted to improvise a reply to the question regarding food for the imagination in this country. It is what it is in any country: reality. It is true that reality over here is different from the reality to which you are accustomed. It is also true that it not only changes from place to place, but from time to time and that in every place and at every time the imagination makes its way by reason of it. This is a simple and unrhetorical answer to your question. A man is not bothered by the reality to which he is accustomed, that is to say, in the midst of which he has been born. He may be very much disturbed by reality elsewhere, but even as to that it would be only a question of time. You are just as likely as not when you return to Vienna to be horrified by what you may consider to be extraordinary change or series of changes.

Notes

References 

 Buttel, Robert. Wallace Stevens: The Making of Harmonium. 1967: Princeton University Press.
 Stevens, Holly. Letters of Wallace Stevens. 1966: University of California Press.
 Vendler, Helen. On Extended Wings. 1969: Harvard University Press.

1921 poems
American poems
Poetry by Wallace Stevens